Juris Kalniņš (8 March 1938 – 9 February 2010) was a Soviet and Latvian basketball player. He played as a shooting guard and small forward. Kalniņš won a silver medal at the 1964 Summer Olympics. He won a bronze medal at the 1963 World Champs and a gold at the 1963 European Champs.

References 

1938 births
2010 deaths
Basketball players at the 1964 Summer Olympics
Latvian men's basketball players
Olympic basketball players of the Soviet Union
Olympic medalists in basketball
Olympic silver medalists for the Soviet Union
Shooting guards
Small forwards
Soviet men's basketball players
1963 FIBA World Championship players
Medalists at the 1964 Summer Olympics